The 1989–90 NBA season was the Rockets' 23rd season in the National Basketball Association, and 19th season in the city of Houston. After a 9–6 start to the season, the Rockets would struggle posting a 12–18 record as they entered the New Year. However, they would manage to win seven of their next nine games, holding a 22–25 record at the All-Star break. At midseason, the team acquired Vernon Maxwell from the San Antonio Spurs, as they continued to play .500 basketball for the rest of the season. The Rockets finished fifth in the Midwest Division with a 41–41 record, winning a tie-breaker over the Seattle SuperSonics for the #8 seed in the Western Conference.

Akeem Olajuwon led the Rockets with 24.3 points, 14.0 rebounds and 4.6 blocks per game, and was named to the All-NBA Second Team, the NBA All-Defensive First Team, and was selected for the 1990 NBA All-Star Game. In addition, Otis Thorpe averaged 17.1 points and 9.0 rebounds per game, while Mitchell Wiggins averaged 15.5 points per game, Buck Johnson provided the team with 14.8 points and 1.3 steals per game, and Sleepy Floyd contributed 12.2 points and 7.3 assists per game. Olajuwon also finished in seventh place in Most Valuable Player voting, and in second place in Defensive Player of the Year voting.

However, in the Western Conference First Round of the playoffs, the Rockets lost to the top-seeded Los Angeles Lakers in four games. Following the season, Wiggins was released to free agency, and John Lucas and Tim McCormick were both traded to the Atlanta Hawks.

Draft picks

The Rockets had no draft picks in 1989.

Roster

Regular season

Season standings

z – clinched division title
y – clinched division title
x – clinched playoff spot

Record vs. opponents

Game log

Playoffs

|- align="center" bgcolor="#ffcccc"
| 1
| April 27
| @ L.A. Lakers
| L 89–101
| Otis Thorpe (21)
| Akeem Olajuwon (14)
| Sleepy Floyd (8)
| Great Western Forum17,505
| 0–1
|- align="center" bgcolor="#ffcccc"
| 2
| April 29
| @ L.A. Lakers
| L 100–104
| Sleepy Floyd (27)
| Akeem Olajuwon (11)
| Sleepy Floyd (8)
| Great Western Forum17,505
| 0–2
|- align="center" bgcolor="#ccffcc"
| 3
| May 1
| L.A. Lakers
| W 114–108
| Otis Thorpe (27)
| Otis Thorpe (8)
| Sleepy Floyd (18)
| The Summit16,611
| 1–2
|- align="center" bgcolor="#ffcccc"
| 4
| May 3
| L.A. Lakers
| L 88–109
| Akeem Olajuwon (28)
| Akeem Olajuwon (10)
| Sleepy Floyd (10)
| The Summit16,611
| 1–3
|-

Player statistics

NOTE: Please write the players statistics in alphabetical order by last name.

Season

Playoffs

Awards and records
Akeem Olajuwon, All-NBA Second Team
Akeem Olajuwon, NBA All-Defensive First Team

Transactions

See also
1989–90 NBA season

References

Houston Rockets seasons